

Events

January

 January 6 – The Asian Socialist Conference opens in Rangoon, Burma.
 January 12 – Estonian émigrés found a government-in-exile in Oslo.
 January 14
 Marshal Josip Broz Tito is chosen President of Yugoslavia.
 The CIA-sponsored Robertson Panel first meets to discuss the UFO phenomenon.
 January 15 – Georg Dertinger, foreign minister of East Germany, is arrested for spying.
 January 19 – 71.1% of all television sets in the United States are tuned into I Love Lucy, to watch Lucy give birth to Little Ricky, which is more people than those who tune into Dwight Eisenhower's inauguration the next day. This record has yet to be broken.
 January 20 – Dwight D. Eisenhower is sworn in as the 34th President of the United States.
 January 24
 Mau Mau Uprising: Rebels in Kenya kill the Ruck family (father, mother, and six-year-old son).
 Leader of East Germany Walter Ulbricht announces that agriculture will be collectivized in East Germany.
 January 31–February 1 – The North Sea flood of 1953 kills 1,836 people in the southwestern Netherlands (especially Zeeland), 307 in the United Kingdom, and several hundred at sea, including 133 on the ferry  in the Irish Sea.

February

 February 1 – The surge of the North Sea flood continues from the previous day.
 February 3 – Batepá massacre: Hundreds of native creoles, known as forros, are massacred in São Tomé, by the colonial administration and Portuguese landowners.
 February 5 – Walt Disney's feature film Peter Pan premieres.
 February 11
 United States President Dwight D. Eisenhower refuses a clemency appeal for Ethel and Julius Rosenberg.
 The Soviet Union breaks diplomatic relations with Israel, after a bomb explosion at the Soviet Embassy, in reaction to the 'Doctors' plot'.
 February 12 – The Nordic Council is inaugurated.
 February 13 – Transsexual Christine Jorgensen returns to New York after successful sex reassignment surgery in Denmark.
 February 19 – Georgia approves the first literature censorship board in the United States.
 February 25 – Jacques Tati's film, Les Vacances de M. Hulot, is released in France, introducing the gauche character of Monsieur Hulot.
 February 28
 James Watson and Francis Crick of the University of Cambridge announce their discovery of the structure of the DNA molecule.
 Greece, Turkey, and Yugoslavia sign the Balkan Pact.

March

 March 1
 Joseph Stalin suffers a stroke, after an all-night dinner with Soviet Union interior minister Lavrentiy Beria and future premiers Georgy Malenkov, Nikolai Bulganin, and Nikita Khrushchev. The stroke paralyzes the right side of his body and renders him unconscious until his death on March 5.
 Bernard Freyberg, 1st Baron Freyberg is made deputy constable and lieutenant governor of Windsor Castle.
 March 6 – Georgy Malenkov succeeds Joseph Stalin, as Premier and First Secretary of the Communist Party of the Soviet Union.
 March 8 – The Thieves World, which has been transformed into the Russian mafia, are freed from prisons by the Malenkov regime, ending the Bitch Wars.
 March 13 – The United Nations Security Council nominates Dag Hammarskjöld from Sweden as United Nations Secretary General.
 March 14 – Nikita Khrushchev is selected General Secretary of the Communist Party of the Soviet Union.
 March 18 – The Yenice–Gönen earthquake affects western Turkey, with a maximum Mercalli intensity of IX (violent), causing at least 1,070 deaths, and $3.57 million in damage.
 March 19 – The 25th Academy Awards Ceremony is held (the first one broadcast on television).
 March 25–26 – Lari Massacre in Kenya: Mau Mau rebels kill up to 150 Kikuyu natives.
 March 26 – Jonas Salk announces his polio vaccine.
 March 29 – A fire at the Littlefield Nursing Home in Largo, Florida, kills 33 persons, including singer-songwriter Arthur Fields.

April

 April 7 – Dag Hammarskjöld is elected Secretary-General of the United Nations.
 April 8 – Jomo Kenyatta is sentenced to 7 years in prison for the alleged organization of the Mau Mau Uprising in the British Kenya Colony.
 April 16
 President Eisenhower delivers his "Chance for Peace" speech, to the National Association of Newspaper Editors.
 The Habar Corporation's building in Chicago, United States, catches fire, killing 35 employees.
 April 25 – Francis Crick and James Watson publish "Molecular Structure of Nucleic Acids: A Structure for Deoxyribose Nucleic Acid", their description of the double helix structure of DNA.

May

 May 2 – Hussein is crowned King of Jordan.
 May 5 – Aldous Huxley first tries the psychedelic hallucinogen mescaline, inspiring his book The Doors of Perception.
 May 9 
 France agrees to the provisional independence of Cambodia, with King Norodom Sihanouk.
 Australian Senate election, 1953: The Liberal/Country Coalition Government, led by Prime Minister Robert Menzies, holds their Senate majority, despite gains made by the Labor Party, led by H. V. Evatt. This is the first occasion where a Senate election is held without an accompanying House Of Representatives election.
 May 11 – Waco tornado outbreak: An F5 tornado hits in the downtown section of Waco, Texas, killing 114.
 May 15 – The Standards And Recommended Practices (SARPS) for Aeronautical Information Service (AIS) are adopted by the ICAO Council. These SARPS are in Annex 15 to the Chicago Convention, and 15 May is celebrated by the AIS community as "World AIS Day".
 May 25 – Nuclear testing: At the Nevada Test Site, the United States conducts its only nuclear artillery test: Upshot-Knothole Grable.
 May 29 – 1953 British Mount Everest expedition: Sir Edmund Hillary from New Zealand and Tenzing Norgay from Nepal become the first men to reach the summit of Mount Everest.

June

 June 1 – Uprising in Plzeň: Currency reform causes riots in Czechoslovakia.
 June 2 – Elizabeth II is crowned Queen of the United Kingdom and the other Commonwealth realms, at Westminster Abbey.
 June 7 – Italian general election: the Christian Democracy party wins a plurality in both legislative houses.
 June 7-9 – Flint–Worcester tornado outbreak sequence: A single storm-system spawns 46 tornadoes of various sizes, in 10 states from Colorado to Massachusetts, over 3 days, killing 246.
 June 8
 On the second day of the Flint–Worcester tornado outbreak sequence, a tornado kills 116 in Flint, Michigan; it will be the last to claim more than 100 lives, until the 2011 Joplin tornado.
 Austria and the Soviet Union open diplomatic relations.
 June 9
 On the third day of the Flint–Worcester tornado outbreak sequence, a tornado spawned from the same storm system as the Flint tornado the day before hits in Worcester, Massachusetts, killing 94.
 CIA Technical Services Staff head Sidney Gottlieb approves of the use of LSD in an MKUltra subproject.
 June 13 – Hungarian Prime Minister Mátyás Rákosi is replaced by Imre Nagy.
 June 17 – Workers' Uprising in East Germany: The Soviet Union orders a Division of troops into East Berlin to quell a rebellion.
 June 18
 Egypt declares itself a republic.
 Tachikawa air disaster: A United States Air Force Douglas C-124 Globemaster II crashes just after takeoff from Tachikawa Airfield near Tokyo, Japan, killing all 129 people on board in the worst air crash in history up to this time, and the first with a confirmed death toll exceeding 100.
 June 30 – The first roll-on/roll-off ferry crossing of the English Channel, Dover–Boulogne, takes place.

July

 July 3 – The first ascent of Nanga Parbat in the Pakistan Himalayas, the world's ninth highest mountain, is made by Austrian climber Hermann Buhl alone on the German–Austrian expedition.
 July 9 – The U.S. Treasury formally renames the Bureau of Internal Revenue; the new name (which had previously been used informally) is the Internal Revenue Service.
 July 10 – The Soviet official newspaper Pravda announces that Lavrentiy Beria has been deposed as head of the NKVD.
 July 17 – The greatest recorded loss of United States midshipmen in a single event results from an aircraft crash near NAS Whiting Field.
 July 26 – Fidel Castro and his brother lead a disastrous assault on the Moncada Barracks, preliminary to the Cuban Revolution.
 July 27 – The Korean War ends, with the Korean Armistice Agreement: The United Nations Command (Korea) (United States), People's Republic of China and North Korea sign an armistice agreement at Panmunjom, and the north remains communist, while the south remains capitalist.

August

 August 5 – Operation Big Switch: Prisoners of war are repatriated to the United States after the Korean War.
 August 8 – Soviet prime minister Georgi Malenkov announces that the Soviet Union has a hydrogen bomb.
 August 12
 The 1953 Ionian earthquake of magnitude 7.2 totally devastates Cephalonia and most of the other Ionian Islands, in Greece's worst natural disaster in centuries.
 Soviet atomic bomb project: "Joe 4", the first Soviet thermonuclear weapon, is detonated at Semipalatinsk Test Site, Kazakh SSR.
 August 13 – Four million workers go on strike in France to protest against austerity measures.
 August 15–19 – Cold War: 1953 Iranian coup d'état – Overthrow of the democratically elected Prime Minister of Iran, Mohammad Mosaddegh, by Iranian military in favour of strengthening the monarchical rule of the Shah, Mohammad Reza Pahlavi, with the support of the United States Central Intelligence Agency (as "Operation Ajax") and the United Kingdom.
 August 17 – The first planning session of Narcotics Anonymous is held in Southern California (see October 5).
 August 20 – The French government ousts King Mohammed V of Morocco, and exiles him to Corsica.
 August 22 – The last prisoners are repatriated from Devil's Island to France.
 August 25 – The French general strike ends.
 August – High Arctic relocation of Inuit families by the Government of Canada.

September

 September 4 – The discovery of REM sleep is first published, by researchers Eugene Aserinsky and Nathaniel Kleitman.
 September 5 – The United Nations rejects the Soviet Union's suggestion to accept the People's Republic of China as a member.
 September 7 – Nikita Khrushchev becomes head of the Soviet Central Committee.
 September 23 – The Pact of Madrid is signed by Francoist Spain and the United States of America, ending a period of virtual isolation for Spain.
 September 25 – The first German prisoners of war return from the Soviet Union to West Germany.
 September 26 – Rationing of sugar ends in the UK.

October

 October – The UNIVAC 1103 is the first commercial computer to use random-access memory.
 October 5
 Earl Warren is appointed Chief Justice of the United States, by President Dwight D. Eisenhower.
 The first meeting of Narcotics Anonymous is held (the first planning session was held August 17).
 October 6 – UNICEF, the United Nations Children's Fund, is made a permanent specialized agency of the United Nations.
 October 9
 West German federal election, 1953: Konrad Adenauer is re-elected as German chancellor.
 Fearing communist influence in British Guiana, the British Government suspends the constitution, declares a state of emergency, and militarily occupies the colony.
 October 10
 Roland (Monty) Burton wins the 1953 London to Christchurch air race, in under 23 hours flying time.
 The Mutual Defense Treaty Between the United States and the Republic of Korea is concluded in Washington, D.C.
 October 12 – The play The Caine Mutiny Court-Martial opens at Plymouth Theatre, New York.
 October 22 – Laos becomes independent from France.
 October 23 – Alto Broadcasting System in the Philippines makes the first television broadcast in southeast Asia, through DZAQ-TV. Alto Broadcasting System is the predecessor of what will later become ABS-CBN Corporation.
 October 30 – Cold War: U.S. President Dwight D. Eisenhower formally approves the top secret document of the United States National Security Council NSC 162/2, which states that the United States' arsenal of nuclear weapons must be maintained and expanded to counter the communist threat.

November

 November 5 – David Ben-Gurion resigns as prime minister of Israel.
 November 9
 Cambodia becomes independent from France.
 The Laotian Civil War begins between the Kingdom of Laos and the Pathet Lao, all the while resuming the First Indochina War against the French Army in a Two-front war.
 November 20
 The Douglas D-558-2 Skyrocket, piloted by Scott Crossfield, becomes the first manned aircraft to reach Mach 2.
 Authorities at the Natural History Museum, London announce that the skull of Piltdown Man (allegedly an early human discovered in 1912) is a hoax.
 November 20–22 – First Indochina War: Operation Castor – In a massive airborne operation in Vietnam, French forces establish a base at Điện Biên Phủ.
 November 21 – Puerto Williams is founded in Chile, as the southernmost settlement of the world.
 November 25 – Match of the Century (1953 England v Hungary football match): The England national football team loses 6–3 to Hungary at Wembley Stadium, their first ever loss to a continental team at home.
 November 29 – First Indochina War: Battle of Dien Bien Phu – French paratroopers consolidate their position at Điện Biên Phủ.
 November 30 – Kabaka crisis: Edward Mutesa II, the kabaka (king) of Buganda, is deposed and exiled to London by Sir Andrew Benjamin Cohen, Governor of Uganda.

December

 December 2 – The United Kingdom and Iran reform diplomatic relations.
 December 6 – With the NBC Symphony Orchestra, conductor Arturo Toscanini performs what he claims is his favorite Beethoven symphony, Eroica, for the last time. The live performance is broadcast across the United States on radio, and later released on records and CD.
 December 7 – A visit to Iran by American Vice President Richard Nixon sparks several days of riots, as a reaction to the August 19 overthrow of the government of Mohammed Mossadegh by the U.S.-backed Shah. Three students are shot dead by police in Tehran. This event becomes an annual commemoration.
 December 8 – U.S. President Dwight D. Eisenhower delivers his Atoms for Peace address, to the United Nations General Assembly.
 December 17 – The U.S. Federal Communications Commission (FCC) approves color television (using the NTSC standard).
 December 23 – The Soviet Union announces officially that Lavrentiy Beria has been executed.
 December 24 – Tangiwai disaster: A railway bridge collapses at Tangiwai, New Zealand, sending a fully loaded passenger train into the Whangaehu River; 151 are killed.
 December 25 – The Amami Islands are returned to Japan, after 8 years of United States military occupation.
 December 30 – Ramon Magsaysay becomes the 7th President of the Philippines.

Date unknown
 Global meat packing industry JBS is founded in Anapolis, Goias, Brazil.
 China First Building Corporation, as predecessor part of China State Construction Engineering, founded in Beijing.

Births

January

 January 1 – Gary Johnson, American businessman, politician and 29th Governor of New Mexico
 January 4 – George Tenet, American Central Intelligence Agency director
 January 5
 Pamela Sue Martin, American actress
 Mike Rann, Australian politician
 January 6 – Malcolm Young, Australian musician (d. 2017)
 January 10
 Pat Benatar, American rock singer
 Bobby Rahal, American race car driver
 January 11 – Eduard Kučera, Czech businessman, co-founder of Avast Software
 January 13 – John Wake, English cricketer
 January 16 – Robert Jay Mathews, American neo-Nazi, founder of the terrorist group The Order (d. 1984)
 January 19 – Richard Legendre, Canadian tennis player, politician
 January 20 – Jeffrey Epstein, American financier and sex offender (d. 2019)
 January 21 – Paul Allen, American entrepreneur, co-founder of Microsoft (d. 2018)
 January 22
 Myung-whun Chung, South Korean conductor, pianist
 Jim Jarmusch, American director
 January 23 – Dušan Nikolić, Yugoslav footballer (d. 2018)
 January 24 – Moon Jae-in, 19th President of South Korea
 January 26
 Anders Fogh Rasmussen, Prime Minister of Denmark, Secretary General of NATO
 Lucinda Williams, American singer-songwriter
 January 28 – Colin Campbell, Canadian ice hockey player, executive
 January 29
 Peter Baumann, German keyboard player, songwriter (Tangerine Dream)
 Paulin Bordeleau, Canadian ice hockey player
 Lynne McGranger, Australian actress
 Juan Paredes, Mexican boxer
 Louie Pérez, American singer-songwriter and guitarist 
 Fred Riebeling, Australian politician
 Grażyna Szmacińska, Polish chess player
 Teresa Teng, Taiwanese singer (d. 1995)
 Yorie Terauchi, Japanese actress
 Hwang Woo-suk, South Korean veterinarian, academic
 January 31 – Sergei Ivanov, Russian first deputy prime minister and minister of defense

February

 February 2 – Duane Chapman, American bounty hunter
 February 4 – Kitarō, Japanese New Age musician
 February 7 – Dan Quisenberry, American baseball player (d. 1998)
 February 8 – Mary Steenburgen, American actress
 February 9
 Ciarán Hinds, Irish actor
 Rick Wagoner, American automotive executive
 February 10 – June Jones, American quarterback, current NCAA Football head coach at Southern Methodist University
 February 11 – Jeb Bush, American politician, 43rd Governor of Florida
 February 12 – Nabil Shaban, Jordanian-British actor and writer
 February 14 – Sergey Mironov, Russian statesman, Speaker of the Federation Council
 February 19
Cristina Fernández de Kirchner, Argentine lawyer and politician, President of Argentina and Vice President of Argentina
Conrad Murray, Grenadian cardiologist who was the personal physician of Michael Jackson
Massimo Troisi, Italian actor, film director (d. 1994)
 February 20 – Riccardo Chailly, Italian orchestral conductor
 February 21 – William Petersen, American actor
 February 22 – Geoffrey Perkins, British comedy producer, writer and actor (d. 2008)
 February 25
 José María Aznar, Prime Minister of Spain
 Martin Kippenberger, German artist
 February 26 – Michael Bolton, American singer 
 February 27
 Ian Khama, 4th President of Botswana
 Yolande Moreau, Belgian actress, writer and director
 February 28
 Paul Krugman, American economist
 Ricky Steamboat, American professional wrestler
 Osmo Vänskä, Finnish orchestral conductor

March

 March 1 – Richard Bruton, Irish politician, economist
 March 3
 Arthur Antunes Coimbra, Brazilian footballer, manager
 Robyn Hitchcock, British singer-songwriter
 Agustí Villaronga, Spanish filmmaker
 March 4
 Emilio Estefan, Cuban percussionist
 Scott Hicks, Australian film director
 Rose Laurens, French singer-songwriter (d. 2018)
 Kay Lenz, American actress
 March 5 – Tokyo Sexwale, South African businessman, politician, anti-apartheid activist and political prisoner
 March 6 – Jan Kjærstad, Norwegian author
 March 10 – Debbie Brill, Canadian high jumper
 March 11  
 László Bölöni, Romanian footballer
 Bernie LaBarge, Canadian guitarist/vocalist
 March 12
 Carl Hiaasen, American author
 Ron Jeremy, American pornographic and straight actor, filmmaker and stand-up comedian
 Madhav Kumar Nepal, Nepalese politician
 March 14 – Johan Ullman, Swedish medical doctor, physicist and inventor
 March 15 – Kumba Iala, Guinea-Bissauan politician, 3rd President of Guinea-Bissau (d. 2014)
 March 16
 Bryan Duncan, American Christian musician
 Isabelle Huppert, French actress
 Richard Stallman, American free software proponent
 March 17 – Filemon Lagman, Filipino revolutionary (d. 2001)
 March 18 – Takashi Yoshimatsu, Japanese composer
 March 19 – Lenín Moreno, Ecuadorian politician, 44th President of Ecuador
 March 20 – Sándor Csányi, Hungarian business executive, banker
 March 23 – Chaka Khan, African-American soul singer  
 March 24 – Mathias Richling, German comedian
 March 26
 Lincoln Chafee, American politician
 Elaine Chao, American politician, wife of Senator Mitch McConnell
 March 28 – Melchior Ndadaye, 4th President of Burundi (d. 1993)

April

 April 2
 Jim Allister, Irish politician
 Rosemary Bryant Mariner, American naval aviator (d. 2019)
 April 3
 Sandra Boynton, American author, songwriter and illustrator
 Russ Francis, American football player
 April 4 – Robert Bertrand, Canadian politician
 April 6 – Andy Hertzfeld, American computer programmer
 April 9 – John Howard, English singer-songwriter
 April 10 – Heiner Lauterbach, German actor
 April 11
 Guy Verhofstadt, Prime Minister of Belgium
 Andrew Wiles, British-born mathematician
 April 13 – Stephen Byers, English Labour Party politician, Secretary of State for Transport
 April 14 – Eric Tsang, Hong Kong actor
 April 16
 Peter Garrett, Australian musician, politician
 J. Neil Schulman, American writer, activist 
 April 17 – Linda Martin, Irish singer, television presenter and Eurovision Song Contest 1992 winner
 April 18 – Rick Moranis, Canadian actor 
 April 19 
 Sara Simeoni, Italian high jumper
 Ruby Wax, American-born British-based performer 
 April 20 – Sebastian Faulks, British novelist
 April 22 – Juhani Komulainen, Finnish composer
 April 24 – Eric Bogosian, American actor, playwright, monologist and novelist
 April 25 – Ron Clements, American animation director, producer
 April 27 – Arielle Dombasle, American born-French actress and singer
 April 28 
 Roberto Bolaño, Chilean author (d. 2003)
 Kim Gordon, American rock musician
 April 29
 Nikolai Budarin, Russian cosmonaut
 Bill Drummond, South African-born British artist and musician (The KLF, K Foundation etc.)
 April 30 – Merrill Osmond, American pop singer

May

 May 2
 Valery Gergiev, Russian-Ossetian conductor
 Jamaal Wilkes, American basketball player
 May 3
 Salman Hashimikov, Soviet heavyweight wrestler
 Gary Young, American musician (Pavement, Gary Young's Hospital)
 May 5
 Ibrahim Zakzaky, Nigerian Shia-Islam cleric
 Dieter Zetsche, German auto executive
 May 6
 Aleksandr Akimov, Soviet engineer who was the shift supervisor during the events of the Chernobyl disaster (d. 1986)
 Tony Blair, Prime Minister of the United Kingdom
 Graeme Souness, Scottish footballer, manager
 Lynn Whitfield, African-American actress
 May 7 – Ian McKay, British soldier (VC recipient) (d. 1982)
 May 8 
 Billy Burnette, American musician
 Alex Van Halen, Dutch-born American rock musician
 May 11 – David Gest, American entertainer, producer and television personality (d. 2016)
 May 14 
 Michael Hebranko, American exemplar of morbid/mortal obesity (d. 2013)
 Norodom Sihamoni, King of Cambodia
 May 15
 George Brett, American Major League Baseball player
 Mike Oldfield, English composer (Tubular Bells)
 May 16 
 Pierce Brosnan, Irish actor
 Richard Page, American musician
 May 17 – Luca Prodan, Italian–Scottish musician and singer (d. 1987)
 May 19 – Victoria Wood, English comic performer (d. 2016)
 May 20 – Robert Doyle, Australian politician
 May 21 – Jim Devine, British politician
 May 23 – Agathe Uwilingiyimana, 4th Prime Minister of Rwanda (d. 1994)
 May 24 – Alfred Molina, English actor
 May 26
 Kay Hagan, American lawyer, banking executive and politician (d. 2019)
 Michael Portillo, English politician
 May 29
 Aleksandr Abdulov, Russian actor (d. 2008)
 Danny Elfman, American composer
 May 30 – Colm Meaney, Irish actor
 May 31 – Kathie Sullivan, American singer

June

 June 1
 David Berkowitz, American serial killer
 Diana Canova, American actress, adjunct professor
 June 2
 Keith Allen, British actor
 Cornel West, African-American philosopher, political activist, social critic, author
 June 3 – Erland Van Lidth De Jeude, Dutch-born wrestler, opera singer and actor (d. 1987)
 June 4
 Paul De Meo, American screenwriter, producer (d. 2018) 
 Susumu Ojima, Japanese entrepreneur
 June 5 – Kathleen Kennedy, American film producer
 June 7
 Johnny Clegg, South African Zulu musician and anthropologist (d. 2019)
 Dougie Donnelly, Scottish television broadcaster
 June 8 – Ivo Sanader, 8th Prime Minister of Croatia
 June 10 – John Edwards, American politician
 June 11 
 Peter Bergman, American actor
 Barbara Minty, American model
 June 12 – Michael Donovan, Canadian voice actor
 June 13 
 Tim Allen, American actor, comedian (Home Improvement) 
 Atso Almila, Finnish conductor, composer
June 14 – Hana Laszlo, Israeli actress and comedian
June 15 
Antonia Rados, Austrian television journalist
Xi Jinping, General Secretary of the Chinese Communist Party, Paramount leader of China
 June 20 – Ulrich Mühe, German actor (d. 2007)
 June 21 – Benazir Bhutto, Prime Minister of Pakistan (d. 2007)
 June 22
 Wim Eijk, Dutch archbishop
 Cyndi Lauper, American singer (Girls Just Wanna Have Fun)
June 23
Vincenzo Di Nicola, Italian-Canadian psychologist, psychiatrist and philosopher
 June 24 – Ivo Lill, Estonian artist
 June 29
 Don Dokken, American rock singer, musician
 Colin Hay, Scottish-born Australian singer-songwriter (Men at Work)
 Ingo Kühl, German painter, sculptor and architect

July

 July 1
 Pat Donovan, American football offensive lineman
 Lawrence Gonzi, 11th Prime Minister of Malta
 Jadranka Kosor, Croatian politician
 Nasir Ali Mamun, Bengali portrait photographer
 Sangay Ngedup, Prime Minister of Bhutan
 July 2 – Nacer Sandjak, Algerian footballer and manager
 July 3 
 Ana Botella, Spanish politician
 Lotta Sollander, Swedish alpine skier
 Les Strong, English association footballer
 July 11 
 Angélica Aragón, Mexican actress
 Leon Spinks, African-American boxer (d. 2021)
 July 12 – Alessi Brothers, American pop rock singer-songwriter duo
 July 15
 Jean-Bertrand Aristide, President of Haiti
 Raisul Islam Asad, Bangladeshi actor
 Neda Arnerić, Serbian film and television actress, and politician (d. 2020)
 July 19 – Shōichi Nakagawa, Japanese politician (d. 2009)
 July 21
 Jeff Fatt, Australian musician, former member of The Wiggles 
 Sylvia Chang, Taiwanese actress
 July 23 – Najib Abdul Razak, 6th Prime Minister of Malaysia
 July 24
 Tadashi Kawamata, Japanese contemporary artist
 Claire McCaskill, U.S. Senator
 July 25 – Tim Gunn, American fashion expert
 July 27 – Yahoo Serious, Australian filmmaker
 July 29
 Ken Burns, American documentary filmmaker
 Geddy Lee, Canadian rock musician (Rush)
 Patti Scialfa, American singer and guitarist
 July 31
 Tōru Furuya, Japanese voice actor
 James Read, American actor

August

 August 1
 Robert Cray, American musician
 Steven Krasner, American sportswriter
 August 2 – Butch Patrick, American child actor and musician
 August 4 – Antonio Tajani, Italian politician, President of the European Parliament
 August 5 
 András Ligeti, Hungarian violinist and conductor (d. 2021)
 Rick Mahler, American baseball player (d. 2005)
 August 8 – Nigel Mansell, English 1992 Formula 1 world champion
 August 9 – Jean Tirole, French Nobel Prize-winning economist
 August 11 – Hulk Hogan, American professional wrestler
 August 12
 Carlos Mesa, President of Bolivia
 Teddi Siddall, American actress (d. 2018)
 August 14 
 Cliff Johnson, American game designer
 James Horner, American film composer (d. 2015)
 August 15
 Wolfgang Hohlbein, German writer of science fiction, fantasy and horror fiction 
 Carol Thatcher, English television personality
 Sir Mark Thatcher, English businessman
 August 16 – Kathie Lee Gifford, American singer and actress
 August 17 – Herta Müller, German Nobel Prize-winning writer
 August 18 – Louie Gohmert, American politician
 August 19 – Benoît Régent, French actor (d. 1994)
 August 20
 Peter Horton, American actor and director
 Mike Jackson, member of the Texas Senate
 August 21 – Géza Szőcs, Hungarian poet and politician
 August 24 – Ron Holloway, American tenor saxophonist
 August 26
 Edward Lowassa, 8th Prime Minister of Tanzania
 Pat Sharkey, Irish footballer
 August 27 – Alex Lifeson, Canadian rock musician (Rush)
 August 29 – James Quesada, Nicaraguan-born anthropologist
 August 30 – Robert Parish, American basketball player
 August 31 – György Károly, Hungarian author (d. 2018)

September
 September 2 – John Zorn, American musician
 September 4 – Fatih Terim, Turkish footballer and manager
 September 8 – Stu Ungar, American poker player (d. 1998)
 September 9 – Simon Warr, British broadcaster (BBC) and actor (That'll Teach 'Em) (d. 2020)
 September 10 – Amy Irving, American actress
 September 12 
 Nan Goldin, American photographer
 Stephen Sprouse, American fashion designer, artist and photographer (d. 2004)
 September 13 – Ann Dusenberry, American film actress
 September 19 – Probal Dasgupta, Indian linguist and Esperantist
 September 22 – Ségolène Royal, French politician
 September 23 – Alexey Maslov, commander-in-chief of the Russian Ground Forces
 September 27 – Greg Ham, Australian rock musician (Men at Work) (d. 2012)
 September 29 – Denis Potvin, Canadian Hall of Fame hockey player

October

 October 1 
 Grete Waitz, Norwegian athlete (d. 2011)
 Klaus Wowereit, German politician 
 October 2 – Brandon Wilson, American author and explorer
 October 3 – Karen Bass, American politician, 43rd Mayor of Los Angeles
 October 4 – Kerry Sherman, American actress
 October 7 – Tico Torres, American Drummer (Bon Jovi)
 October 9 – Tony Shalhoub, American actor
 October 10 – Midge Ure, Scottish musician, singer-songwriter and producer
 October 12
 Les Dennis, British comedian and television presenter
 Serge Lepeltier, French politician
 October 14 
 Greg Evigan, American actor
 Shelley Ackerman, American astrologer, actress, writer
 October 15
 Tito Jackson, African-American singer and guitarist (The Jackson 5)
 Larry Miller, American actor and comedian
 October 16 – Martha Smith, American model and actress
 October 21
 Keith Green, American-born Christian piano player (d. 1982)
 Peter Mandelson, British politician and member of the Labour Party
 Hugh Wolff, American orchestral conductor
 October 22 – Loyiso Nongxa, South African mathematician
 October 24
 Christoph Daum, German footballer and manager
 Steven Hatfill, American physician, virologist and bio-weapons expert
 David Wright, British composer and producer, co-founder of AD Music
 October 26 – Keith Strickland, American musician (The B-52's)
 October 27
 Paul Alcock, English football referee (d. 2018)
 Peter Firth, British actor
 Robert Picardo, American actor
 October 29 – Lorelei King, American-born actress
 October 31 – Michael J. Anderson, American actor

November

 November 1 
Darrell Issa, American businessman and Congressman
 Susan Tse, Hong Kong actress and opera singer
 Bruce Poliquin, American politician
 November 2 – Tom Lyle, American comics artist (d. 2019)
 November 3
Koji Horaguchi, Japanese rugby union player (d. 1999)
 Dennis Miller, American comedian and radio host
 Kate Capshaw, American actress
 November 4
 Carlos Gutierrez, American politician
 Peter Lord, British film producer and director
 Van Stephenson, American singer-songwriter (d. 2001)
 November 5 – Florentino V. Floro, Filipino dwarf judge
 November 7 – Ottfried Fischer, German actor and Kabarett artist 
 November 8 – John Musker, American animation director
 November 11
 Andy Partridge, British musician and frontman of the band XTC
 November 13 
 Andrés Manuel López Obrador, President of Mexico (2018—present)
 Waswo X. Waswo, American photographer
 Diana Weston, Canadian-born English screen actress
 Mokhtar Dahari, Malaysian footballer (d. 1991)
 November 14 – Dominique de Villepin, Prime Minister of France
 November 15 – Alexander O'Neal, American singer
 November 16 – Griff Rhys Jones, Welsh comedian, writer, actor and television presenter
 November 18 
 Alan Moore, English writer and magician
 Kevin Nealon, American actor and comedian
 Kath Soucie, American voice actress
 November 19
 Robert Beltran, American actor
 Tom Villard, American actor (d. 1994)
 November 23 – Francis Cabrel, French singer
 November 24 
 Glenn Withrow, American actress
 Tod Machover, American composer
 November 25 – Graham Eadie, Australian rugby league player
 November 27 
 Steve Bannon, American political figure
 Boris Grebenshchikov, Soviet and Russian rock musician
 Curtis Armstrong, American actor 
 November 28 – Pamela Hayden, American voice actress
 November 29
Alex Grey, American artist
 Vlado Kreslin, Slovenian singer
 Christine Pascal, French actress, director and screenwriter (d. 1996)
 Rosemary West, British serial killer
 November 30 – June Pointer, American singer (The Pointer Sisters) (d. 2006)

December

 December 2 – Joel Fuhrman, American certified family physician
 December 6
Geoff Hoon, British Labour Party politician
Tom Hulce, American actor and theater producer
Gary Ward, American baseball player
 December 8
 Kim Basinger, American actress and fashion model
 Norman G. Finkelstein, American political scientist
 Sam Kinison, American comedian (d. 1992)
 December 9 – John Malkovich, American actor and film director
 December 13 
 Ben Bernanke, American economist, Federal Reserve System chairman
 Bob Gainey, Canadian hockey player
 December 14 – Vangelis Meimarakis, Greek lawyer and politician, 4th Greek Minister for National Defence
 December 17
 Ikue Mori, Japanese drummer, composer and graphic designer
 Bill Pullman, American actor
 December 18
 Kevin Beattie, English footballer (d. 2018) 
 Khas-Magomed Hadjimuradov, Chechen bard
 December 21 – András Schiff, Hungarian concert pianist and conductor
 December 23 
 Nuria Bages, Mexican stage and television actress
 Marián Geišberg, Slovak actor (d. 2018)
 Martha Wash, American singer-songwriter, actress and producer
 December 24 – Timothy Carhart, American actor
 December 26
 Leonel Fernández, President of the Dominican Republic
 Toomas Hendrik Ilves, Estonian politician, 4th President of Estonia
 December 27 – Gina Lopez, Filipino environmentalist and philanthropist (d. 2019)
 December 28 
 Richard Clayderman, French pianist
 Tatsumi Fujinami, Japanese professional wrestler
 December 29 
 Thomas Bach, 9th President of the International Olympic Committee
 Stanley Williams, American reformed murderer (d. 2005)
 December 31 – James Remar, American actor

Date unknown
 Ely Ould Mohamed Vall, 6th President of Mauritania (d. 2017)
 Dan Petrescu, Romanian businessman and billionaire

Deaths

January

 January 1
 Maksim Purkayev, Soviet general (b. 1894)
 Hank Williams, American singer-songwriter and musician (b. 1923)
 January 2 – Guccio Gucci, founder of Gucci (b. 1881)
 January 4
 Arthur Hoyt, American actor (b. 1874)
 Yasuhito, Prince Chichibu, Japanese prince (b. 1902)
 January 5 – Mitchell Hepburn, Canadian politician, 11th Premier of Ontario (b. 1896)
 January 7
Henry Diesen, Norwegian admiral (b. 1883)
Osa Johnson, American adventurer and documentary filmmaker (b. 1894)
 January 8 – Charles Edward Merriam, American political scientist (b. 1874)
 January 9 – Madame le Corbeau (Marguerite Pitre), Canadian murderer (b. 1909) (hanged)
 January 13 – Sir Edward Marsh, English polymath and civil servant (b. 1872)
 January 16 – Israel Goldstine, New Zealand lawyer and politician (b. 1898)
 January 21 – Mary Mannering, early 20th-century English stage actress (b. 1876)
 January 28 – James Scullin, 9th Prime Minister of Australia (b. 1876)
 January 29 – Sir Reginald Wingate, British army general and colonial administrator (b. 1861)
 January 30 – Lionel Belmore, English actor (b. 1867)

February–March

 February 1 – William Sydney Marchant, British colonial official (b. 1894)
 February 2 – Alan Curtis, American actor (b. 1909)
 February 3 – Richard Rushall, British businessman (b. 1865)
 February 5 – Iuliu Maniu, 32nd Prime Minister of Romania (b. 1873)
 February 9 – Cecil Hepworth, English director (b. 1874)
 February 12 – Hal Colebatch, Australian politician (b. 1872)
 February 16 – James L. Kraft, Canadian-American entrepreneur, inventor (b. 1874)
 February 19 – Nobutake Kondō, Japanese admiral (b. 1886)
 February 20 – Francesco Saverio Nitti, Italian economist and political figure, 24th Prime Minister of Italy (b. 1868)
 February 21 – Konrad Krafft von Dellmensingen, Bavarian general (b. 1862)
 February 24 – Gerd von Rundstedt, German field marshal (b. 1875)
 February 25 – Sergei Winogradsky, Russian scientist (b. 1856)
 February 27 – Paul Hurst, American actor (b. 1888)
 March 2 – Jim Lightbody, American middle-distance runner (b. 1882)
 March 3 – James J. Jeffries, American boxing champion (b. 1875)
 March 5
 Herman J. Mankiewicz, American writer and producer (b. 1897)
 Sergei Prokofiev, Soviet and Russian composer (b. 1891)
 Joseph Stalin, Soviet leader (b. 1878)
 March 7 – Edward Sedgwick, American director (b. 1892)
 March 13 – Johan Laidoner, Commander-in-chief of the Estonian Army (b. 1884)
 March 14 – Klement Gottwald, 5th President of Czechoslovakia (b. 1896)
 March 15 – Carl Stockdale, American actor (b. 1874)
 March 20 – Graciliano Ramos, Brazilian writer (b. 1892)
 March 21 – Toni Wolff, Swiss psychoanalyst (b. 1888)
 March 22 – Gustav Herglotz, German mathematician (b. 1881)
 March 23
 Raoul Dufy, French painter (b. 1875)
 Oskar Luts, Estonian writer and playwright (b. 1887)
 March 24
 Mary of Teck, consort of George V of the United Kingdom (b. 1867)
 Paul Couturier, French priest (b. 1881)
 March 28 – Jim Thorpe, Native-American athlete, Olympic medalist, professional baseball player and a member of the Pro Football Hall of Fame (b. 1887)
 March 31 – Ivan Lebedeff, Russian actor (b. 1895)

April

 April 2
 Jean Epstein, French film director (b. 1897)
 Hugo Sperrle, German field marshal (b. 1885)
 April 4 
 King Carol II of Romania (b. 1893)
 Rachilde, French author (b. 1860)
 April 9 
 Eddie Cochems, American father of the forward pass in football (b. 1877)
 Hans Reichenbach, German philosopher (b. 1891)
 Stanisław Wojciechowski, 2nd President of the Republic of Poland (b. 1869)
 April 11
 Boris Kidrič, 1st Prime Minister of Slovenia (b. 1912)
 Kid Nichols, American baseball player (Boston Braves) and a member of the MLB Hall of Fame (b. 1869)
 April 12 – Lionel Logue, Australian speech and language therapist (b. 1880)
 April 13 –  Eduard C. Lindeman, American social worker and author (b. 1885)
April 20 – Erich Weinert, German writer, member of the Communist Party of Germany (b. 1890)
 April 27 – Maud Gonne, English-born Irish republican revolutionary, memoirist; spouse of John MacBride (b. 1866)
 April 29 – Alice Prin, French artists' model (b. 1901)

May–June

 May 1 – Everett Shinn, American painter (b. 1876)
 May 8 – Anna Rüling, German journalist, "the first known lesbian activist" (b. 1880)
 May 16 
 Nicolae Rădescu, Romanian military officer and statesman, 45th Prime Minister of Romania (b. 1874)
 Django Reinhardt, Belgian jazz musician (b. 1910)
 May 19 – Dámaso Berenguer, Spanish soldier and Prime Minister (b. 1873)
 May 21 – Ernst Zermelo, German logician and mathematician (b. 1871)
 May 27 – Jesse Burkett, American baseball player (Cleveland Spiders) and a member of the MLB Hall of Fame (b. 1868)
 May 29 – Man Mountain Dean, American professional wrestler (b. 1891)
 May 30 – Dooley Wilson, American actor (b. 1886)
 May 31 – Vladimir Tatlin, Soviet and Russian painter and architect (b. 1885)
 June 1 – Alex James, Scottish football (soccer) player (b. 1901)
 June 5
 William Farnum, American actor (b. 1876)
 Bill Tilden, American tennis champion (b. 1893)
 Roland Young, English actor (b. 1887)
 June 9 – Godfrey Tearle, American actor (b. 1884)
 June 15 – Henry Scattergood, American cricketer (b. 1877)
 June 18 – René Fonck, French aviator, top Allied World War I Flying Ace (b. 1894)
 June 19
 Harold Cazneaux, Australian photographer (b. 1878)
 Julius and Ethel Rosenberg, American communist spies (b. 1918 and 1915, respectively) (executed on same day)
 Norman Ross, American Olympic swimmer (b. 1896)
 June 22 – Bill Lange, American sports coach (b. 1897)
 June 23 – Albert Gleizes, French artist and theoretician (b. 1881)
 June 30 – Elsa Beskow, Swedish author and illustrator of children's books (b. 1874)

July

 July 1 – Totius, Afrikaans poet (b. 1877)
 July 9 – Annie Kenney, British working-class suffragette (b. 1879)
 July 11 – Oliver Campbell, American tennis player (b. 1871)
 July 12 – Herbert Rawlinson, English actor (b. 1885)
 July 15 – John Christie, English serial killer (b. 1899) (hanged)
 July 16 – Hilaire Belloc, French-born British writer and historian (b. 1870)
 July 17 – Maude Adams, American actress (b. 1872)
 July 20 – Dumarsais Estimé, 30th President of Haiti (b. 1900)
 July 26 – Nikolaos Plastiras, Greek general and Prime Minister (b. 1883)
 July 29 – Richard Pearse, New Zealand airplane pioneer (b. 1877)
 July 31 – Robert A. Taft, American politician, United States Senate Majority Leader (b. 1889)

August

 August 1 – Jānis Mendriks, Soviet Roman Catholic priest (b. 1907)
 August 11 – Tazio Nuvolari, Italian racing driver (b. 1892)
 August 15 – Ludwig Prandtl, German physicist (b. 1875)
 August 22 – Jim Tabor, American baseball player (b. 1916)
 August 30
 Gaetano Merola, Italian conductor (b. 1881)
 Maurice Nicoll, British psychiatrist (b. 1884)

September

 September 2 – Jonathan M. Wainwright, American general and Medal of Honor recipient (b. 1883)
 September 5 
 Richard Walther Darré, Nazi SS General (b. 1895)
 Francis Ford, American actor and director (b. 1881)
 Constantin Levaditi, Romanian physician and microbiologist (b. 1874)
 September 7 – Nobuyuki Abe, Japanese Prime Minister and military leader (b. 1875)
 September 8 – Fred M. Vinson, Chief Justice of the United States (b. 1890)
 September 12
 Hugo Schmeisser, German weapons designer (b. 1884)
 Lewis Stone, American actor (b. 1879)
 September 13 – Mary Brewster Hazelton, American painter (b. 1868)
 September 15 – Erich Mendelsohn, German architect (b. 1887)
 September 24 – Jacobo Fitz-James Stuart, 17th Duke of Alba, Spanish aristocrat (born 1878)
 September 26 – Xu Beihong, Chinese painter (b. 1895)
 September 27 – Hans Fritzsche, German Nazi senior official, one of only three acquitted at the Nuremberg trials (b. 1900)
 September 28 – Edwin Hubble, American astronomer (b. 1889)
 September 30
 Robert Mawdesley, British stage and radio actor (b. 1900)
 Lewis Fry Richardson, English mathematician, physicist, meteorologist, psychologist and pacifist (b. 1881)

October

 October 3 – Sir Arnold Bax, English composer (b. 1887)
 October 6 – Porter Hall, American actor (b. 1888)
 October 8
 Nigel Bruce, British character actor (b. 1895)
 Kathleen Ferrier, British contralto (b. 1912) 
 October 12 – Hjalmar Hammarskjöld, Swedish politician, 13th Prime Minister of Sweden, one of the leaders of World War I (b. 1862)
 October 13 – Millard Mitchell, American actor (b. 1903)
 October 14 – Arthur Wimperis, English illustrator and playwright (b. 1874)
 October 20 – Sir Robert Brooke-Popham, British air chief marshal (b. 1878)
 October 25 – Holger Pedersen, Dutch linguist (b. 1867)
 October 27 – Thomas Wass, English cricketer (b. 1873)

November

 November 5 – Harry A. Marmer, Ukrainian-born American mathematician and oceanographer (b. 1885)
 November 8
 Ivan Bunin, Russian writer, Nobel Prize laureate (b. 1870)
 John van Melle, Dutch-born author (b. 1883)
 November 9
 Louise DeKoven Bowen, American philanthropist and activist (b. 1859)
 King Ibn Saud of Saudi Arabia (b. 1875)
 Dylan Thomas, Welsh poet and author (b. 1914)
 November 16 – T. F. O'Rahilly, Irish academic (b. 1882)
 November 18 – Ruth Crawford Seeger, American composer (b. 1901)
 November 21
 António Cabreira, Portuguese polygraph (b. 1868)
 Larry Shields, American musician (b. 1893)
 November 22 – Sulaiman Nadvi, Indian/Pakistani historian, biographer, littérateur and scholar of Islam (b. 1884)
 November 27 – Eugene O'Neill, American writer, Nobel Prize laureate (b. 1888)
 November 28 – Rudolf Bauer, German-born painter (b. 1889)
 November 29
 Ernest Barnes, English mathematician, scientist and theologian (b. 1874)
 Sam De Grasse, Canadian actor (b. 1875)
 Milt Gross, American comic book illustrator and animator (b. 1895)
 November 30 – Francis Picabia, French painter and poet (b. 1879)

December

 December – Seth Weeks, African-American jazz mandolinist, composer, arranger and bandleader (b. 1868)
 December 2 
 Radu Băldescu, Romanian general (b. 1888)
 Trần Trọng Kim, Vietnamese historian and Prime Minister of the Empire of Vietnam (b. 1883)
 December 5
 Jorge Negrete, Mexican singer and actor (b. 1911)
 Ray Paddock, American farmer and politician (b. 1877)
 December 10 – Abdullah Yusuf Ali, Indian-born Islamic scholar and translator (b. 1872)
 December 14 – Marjorie Kinnan Rawlings, American writer (b. 1896)
 December 19 – Robert Andrews Millikan, American physicist Nobel Prize laureate (b. 1868)
 December 21 – Nicholas H. Heck, American geophysicist, oceanographer and surveyor (b. 1882)
 December 23 – Lavrentiy Beria, Minister of Internal Affairs of the Soviet Union (b. 1899)
 December 25 – Lee Shubert, Polish-born theater owner and operator (b. 1871)
 December 27
 Şükrü Saracoğlu, 9th Prime Minister of Turkey (b. 1887)
 Julian Tuwim, Polish poet (b. 1894)
 December 31 – Albert Plesman, Dutch aviation pioneer (b. 1889)

Nobel Prizes

 Physics – Frits Zernike
 Chemistry – Hermann Staudinger
 Medicine – Hans Adolf Krebs, Fritz Albert Lipmann
 Literature – Sir Winston Leonard Spencer Churchill
 Peace – George Marshall

References